The 2020–21 season was Football Club Lorient's 95th season in existence and the club's first season back in the top flight of French football. In addition to the domestic league, Lorient participated in this season's edition of the Coupe de France. The season covered the period from 1 July 2020 to 30 June 2021.

Players

First-team squad

Out on loan

Transfers

In

Out

Pre-season and friendlies

Competitions

Overall record

Ligue 1

League table

Results summary

Results by round

Matches
The league fixtures were announced on 9 July 2020.

Coupe de France

Statistics

Goalscorers

References

External links

FC Lorient seasons
FC Lorient